Sakolwat Skollah (born February 22, 1991) is a Thai retired professional footballer who plays as a centre back.

International career
He represented Thailand U23 in the 2013 Southeast Asian Games.

Honours

International
Thailand U-23
 Sea Games 
  Gold Medal (1); 2013

References

External links
 

1991 births
Living people
Sakolwat Skollah
Sakolwat Skollah
Association football central defenders
Sakolwat Skollah
Sakolwat Skollah
Sakolwat Skollah
Sakolwat Skollah
Sakolwat Skollah
Sakolwat Skollah
Sakolwat Skollah
Southeast Asian Games medalists in football
Competitors at the 2013 Southeast Asian Games
Nakhon Si United F.C. players